The 1966–67 The Citadel Bulldogs basketball team represented The Citadel, The Military College of South Carolina in the 1966–67 NCAA University Division men's basketball season. The Bulldogs were led by seventh year head coach Mel Thompson and played their home games at The Citadel Armory. They played as a member of the Southern Conference.

The Bulldogs struggled throughout the season, enduring a three-game losing streak and two separate four game losing streaks while only recording consecutive wins twice in the season en route to an 8–17 overall finish, and 6–7 in the SoCon.

The season was later chronicled by Pat Conroy in his memoir My Losing Season.  Conroy was a senior point guard and team Captain for the Bulldogs in the 1966–67 season.

Schedule

|-
|colspan=7 align=center|1967 Southern Conference men's basketball tournament

References

The Citadel Bulldogs basketball seasons
Citadel